Moscow State Textile Institute (formerly A. N. Kosygin Moscow State Textile University) was formed in 1919. It is one of the oldest and institutes for higher studies in textiles in Russia.

History 
In 1981, the institute was named in honor of Soviet Premier Alexei Kosygin, who died the previous year and whose profession was in the textile industry. The institute was upgraded to "Academy" in 1990. It was renamed to A. N. Kosygin Moscow State Textile Academy. Nine years later, the Academy was approved as University and renamed as the A. N. Kosygin Moscow State Textile University in 1999.

About 
The university has its own complex. It comprises 8 different corpuses at the center of the city of Moscow, Russia. The teaching staff at the university is above 560, with 110 of them are Ph.D. and Professors.

The university has the following major departments:
Technology and Production Management
Chemical Technology and Ecology
Weaving, Information Technology
Automation and Energy
Economics and Management
Fashion Designing

The university offers specialization, masters and bachelors in 18 different categories. University has 41 departments, where it offer studies to almost 6700 students. The university has 110 laboratories and 100 auditoriums. The university has its own sports hall, club and three hostels.

The University has served as a center of education for students from Russia and from all over the world. Many students from China, Pakistan, Morocco, Iran, Ghana and India have completed their higher education at the university. The university has a one-room mosque which was built by Muslim students of the university in the hostel at Shablovskaya. The 7th floor of the university hostel is assigned to foreign students.

Alumni

 Denis Simachev
 Grisha Bruskin
 Larisa Sergeeva
 Olga Tolstikova
 Slava Zaitsev
 Victoria Gres
Alvina Shpady

References

External links
Moscow State Textile University Official Website

Educational institutions established in 1919
Moscow State Textile University
Textile schools
1919 establishments in Russia